Tumbledown Cliffs is a conspicuous rock cliffs on the west coast of James Ross Island, about 3 nautical miles (6 km) north of Cape Obelisk. Probably first seen by Dr. Otto Nordenskjöld in 1903. Surveyed by Falkland Islands Dependencies Survey (FIDS) in 1945. The name given by United Kingdom Antarctic Place-Names Committee (UK-APC) is descriptive of the formation of the scree slope at the foot of these cliffs.

Cliffs of James Ross Island